Triple Tiara can refer to: 

American Triple Tiara of Thoroughbred Racing, for three-year-old fillies in New York state
Canadian Triple Tiara of Thoroughbred Racing, for three-year-old fillies in Canada
Papal Tiara or triple tiara, used 1143–1963

See also
Triple Crown of Thoroughbred Racing, three-race series from many countries